Timothy Bigelow may refer to:
Timothy Bigelow (soldier) (1739–1790), soldier in the American Revolutionary War
Timothy Bigelow (lawyer) (1767–1821), his son, American lawyer